The 1998 College Football All-America Team is composed of the following All-American Teams: Associated Press, Football Writers Association of America, American Football Coaches Association, Walter Camp Foundation, The Sporting News and Football News.

The College Football All-America Team is an honor given annually to the best American college football players at their respective positions. The original usage of the term All-America seems to have been to such a list selected by football pioneer Walter Camp in the 1890s. The NCAA officially recognizes All-Americans selected by the AP, AFCA, FWAA, TSN, and the WCFF to determine Consensus All-Americans.

Offense

Quarterback
Tim Couch, Kentucky (FWAA, Walter Camp)
Cade McNown, UCLA (AFCA, AP)
Michael Bishop, Kansas State (TSN, FN)

Running back
Ricky Williams, Texas (AFCA, AP, FWAA, TSN, Walter Camp, FN)
Mike Cloud, Boston College (AFCA, AP, FWAA)
Ron Dayne, Wisconsin (Walter Camp)
Devin West, Missouri (TSN, FN)

Wide receiver
Torry Holt, NC State (AFCA, AP, FWAA, TSN, FN)
Troy Edwards, Louisiana Tech (AFCA, FWAA, Walter Camp)
Peter Warrick, Florida State (AP, TSN, Walter Camp)
David Boston, Ohio State (FWAA, FN)

Tight end
Rufus French, Ole Miss (AFCA, AP, TSN, Walter Camp, FN)

Tackle
Kris Farris, UCLA (AP, FWAA, TSN, Walter Camp, FN)
Aaron Gibson, Wisconsin (AFCA, AP, FWAA, Walter Camp, FN)
Matt Stinchcomb, Georgia (AFCA, AP, Walter Camp, FN)
Jay Humphrey, Texas (TSN)
Jon Jansen, Michigan (AFCA)
Mike Rosenthal, Notre Dame (Walter Camp)

Guard
Rob Murphy, Ohio State (AP, TSN, FN)
Ben Adams, Texas (FWAA)
Doug Brzezinski, Boston College (TSN)
Anthony Cesario, Colorado State (AFCA)
Jason Whitaker, Florida State (FWAA)
Brandon Burlsworth, Arkansas(FN)

Center
Craig Page, Georgia Tech (AP, FWAA, TSN)
Todd McClure, LSU (AFCA)
Grey Ruegamer, Arizona State (Walter Camp)

Defense

End
Tom Burke, Wisconsin (AFCA, AP, FWAA, TSN, Walter Camp, FN)
Montae Reagor, Texas Tech (AFCA, AP, FWAA, TSN, Walter Camp)
Patrick Kerney, Virginia (FWAA, FN)
Corey Moore, Virginia Tech (AFCA)
Robaire Smith, Michigan State (Walter Camp)

Tackle
Jared DeVries, Iowa (AFCA, TSN, Walter Camp)
Booger McFarland, LSU (AP, FN)
Corey Simon, Florida State (AP)

Linebacker
Chris Claiborne, USC (AFCA, AP, FWAA, TSN, Walter Camp, FN)
Dat Nguyen, Texas A&M (AFCA, AP, FWAA, TSN, Walter Camp, FN)
Al Wilson, Tennessee (AFCA, AP, FWAA)
Jeff Kelly, Kansas State (AP, FWAA)
Jevon Kearse, Florida (Walter Camp, FN)
Adalius Thomas, Southern Miss (AFCA)
LaVar Arrington, Penn State (TSN)
Mike Peterson, Florida (TSN)

Cornerback
Chris McAlister, Arizona (AFCA, AP, FWAA, TSN, Walter Camp, FN)
Antoine Winfield, Ohio State (AFCA, AP, FWAA, TSN, Walter Camp, FN)
Champ Bailey, Georgia (AFCA, AP, FWAA, Walter Camp, FN)
Dré Bly, North Carolina (Walter Camp)

Safety
Anthony Poindexter, Virginia (AP, FWAA, TSN)
Damon Moore, Ohio State (TSN)
Tyrone Carter, Minnesota (FN)

Special teams

Kicker
Sebastian Janikowski, Florida State (AP, FWAA, TSN, FN)
Martín Gramática, Kansas State (AFCA, Walter Camp)

Punter
Joe Kristosik, UNLV (AFCA, AP, FWAA, Walter Camp, FN)
Shane Lechler, Texas A&M (TSN)

All-purpose player / return specialist
David Allen, Kansas State (AP, FWAA, TSN)
Kevin Johnson, Syracuse (AFCA)

See also
 1998 All-Big 12 Conference football team
 1998 All-Big Ten Conference football team
 1998 All-SEC football team

References

All-America Team
College Football All-America Teams